Hatari may refer to:

 Hatari!, a 1962 American film directed by Howard Hawks and starring John Wayne
 Hatari (emulator), an Atari ST emulator
 Hatari (band), an Icelandic techno band that participated in the Eurovision Song Contest 2019